Ewandro Stenzowski (born September 27, 1984) is a Brazilian operatic tenor and veteran of the Brazilian Marine Corps. He appeared in concerts and leading tenor roles in South America and Europe.

Biography 
Ewandro Cruz Stenzowski was born in Curitiba, Brazil on September 27, 1984. In Brazil, he earned a Bachelor of Music degree in lyric singing from the Federal University of Rio de Janeiro. He received his Master of Music in opera performance and Solistenexamen in Germany, at the State University of Music and Performing Arts Stuttgart.

Career and education

Brazil
Stenzowski started his singing studies with mezzo-soprano  at the age of 14. In 1999, at age 15, he became the youngest student in the singing program of the School of Music and Fine Arts of Paraná as a student of Lázaro Wenger and Denise Sartori, and made his debut as a concert singer at II Festival Municipal da Canção Ecológica (FEMUCE) in Pinhais, Paraná. Three years later, in 2002, he received the encouragement award Prêmio Estímulo for young singers in the Bidu Sayão International Vocal Competition at only 17 years old. Jury member Luca Targetti, then casting director at La Scala, encouraged Stenzowski to go to Italy and attend masterclasses with Carlo Bergonzi.

In 2006 he performed in the Brazilian premiere of the Gilbert and Sullivan opera Trial by Jury. The same year he joined the Marine Corps of the Brazilian Navy. During his time in the Marine Corps, he continued to sing in competitions. In the following year he won the VIII. Villa-Lobos National Singing Contest (Concurso Nacional de Canto Villa-Lobos, 2007) in Vitória, and third place, best male voice, and the Radió MEC prize in the Francisco Mignone National Contest (Concurso Nacional Francisco Mignone, 2007). Starting in 2008 he became a student of Cilene Fadigas and Nelson Portella at Federal University of Rio de Janeiro, while still in the Navy.

In 2009, Stenzowski recorded Schumann's song cycle Dichterliebe for Rádio MEC. In 2010 he concluded his studies at University of Rio de Janeiro with a bachelor's degree, won the Carlos Gomes competition in Campinas and made his debut at the Theatro Municipal with Janáček's The Makropulos Affair and a concert version of Il Guarany by Antônio Carlos Gomes. Though his Navy service concluded in 2010, he appeared in concert with the Marine Corps Orchestra of Brazil in Theatro Municipal in May 2011.

Europe
Also in 2011 he was a finalist in the international competition Klassik Mania held in Vienna and started studying for his Master of Music degree in Germany at the State University of Music and Performing Arts Stuttgart as a student of Ulrike Sonntag. He made his European operatic debut as Peter Quint in Brittens The Turn of The Screw in the Wilhelma-Theater in Stuttgart. In the 2012/2013 season, Stenzowski became a member of the International Opera Studio at the Staatsoper Stuttgart. Here he appeared as Hrazda in Janáček's Osud, and Flavio in Bellini's Norma.

In 2014, he appeared as Stewa Buryja in Janáček's Jenůfa and Nemorino in Donizetti's L'elisir d'amore at the Landestheater Detmold in North Rhine-Westphalia, before joining the Detmold opera ensemble. In 2018 he sang Erik in a production of Der fliegende Holländer in his Teatro Petruzzelli debut.

In addition to master classes with Carlo Bergonzi in Italy early in his education, Stenzowski attended master classes with Malcom Walker at Conservatoire de Paris, Shirley Close at Florida State University, Peter Berne and Chris Merritt in Germany, Graciela Araya in Chile,  in Brazil and Helen York at Manhattan School of Music.

Recordings

References

External links 

 
 Ewandro Stenzowski Operabase
 Ewandro Stenzowski Bach Cantatas Website
 Ewandro Stenzowski operamusica.com

1984 births
Brazilian operatic tenors
People from Curitiba
Federal University of Paraná alumni
State University of Music and Performing Arts Stuttgart alumni
Federal University of Rio de Janeiro alumni
Living people